Olney station is a SEPTA Regional Rail station in Philadelphia, Pennsylvania. Located at Mascher Street and Tabor Road in the Olney neighborhood, it serves the Fox Chase Line. The station has a 61-space parking lot. In FY 2013, it had a weekday average of 158 boardings and 156 alightings.

The original station building was constructed in 1906 by the Reading Railroad. It was boarded up in the 1980s, and was demolished in 2008. Olney is the last stop inbound before Wayne Junction, where it merges with the Warminster, West Trenton, Lansdale/Doylestown, and Chestnut Hill East lines.

Station layout

References

External links 
Current schedule for the SEPTA Fox Chase/Newtown line
SEPTA station page for Olney
Old Olney Reading RR Station images
 Mascher Street and Tabor Road entrance from Google Maps Street View
SEPTA Regional Rail stations
Former Reading Company stations
Railway stations in the United States opened in 1906
1906 establishments in Pennsylvania